Benthobatis marcida, the blind torpedo, is a species of electric ray  most commonly found in the west–central area of the Atlantic Ocean. Like all electric rays, it can produce an electric shock that can be harmful to humans and other fish.

References

Narcinidae
Fish of the Caribbean
Fish of Cuba
Fish of the Dominican Republic
Fish of the Eastern United States
Fauna of the Southeastern United States
Least concern biota of North America
Least concern biota of the United States
Fish described in 1909